Cresswell William 'Mickey' Crisp (12 May 1908 – 15 April 2001) was an Australian rules footballer who debuted with Carlton in the VFL in the 1931, after winning the 1930 Bendigo Football League's inaugural best and fairest award, the Fred Wood Medal, with Sandhurst.

He was a premiership player in 1938 and regular Victorian interstate representative.

Crisp played most of his career as a centreman but started in the forward line, kicking a career high 53 goals in 1932. He won the inaugural Carlton best and fairest award in 1934, topping the club's goalkicking in the same season. He won the award again in 1938.

External links

Creswell 'Mickey' Crisp at Blueseum

References

1908 births
2001 deaths
Australian rules footballers from Victoria (Australia)
Carlton Football Club players
Carlton Football Club Premiership players
John Nicholls Medal winners
Sandhurst Football Club players
One-time VFL/AFL Premiership players